Harry Jacob van den Bergh (1 April 1942 – 20 March 2020) was a Dutch politician of the Labour Party (PvdA).
In 1977–1987 van den Bergh was a member of the lower house. Later he became a councilor in Amstelveen.

He was a graduate of the University of Amsterdam in political and social science.

References

External links

Official
  Drs. H.J. (Harry) van den Bergh Parlement & Politiek

1942 births
2020 deaths
Dutch anti-war activists
Dutch civil servants
Dutch corporate directors
Dutch human rights activists
Dutch management consultants
Dutch trade association executives
Jewish Dutch politicians
Labour Party (Netherlands) politicians
Members of the House of Representatives (Netherlands)
Municipal councillors of Amstelveen
Politicians from Amsterdam
University of Amsterdam alumni